Chithirai Pookkal is a 1991 Indian Tamil-language romance film directed by Kanmani Subbu. The film stars newcomers Jayanthkumar and Vinodhini, with R. Sarathkumar, Radha Ravi, Charle, S. S. Chandran and Vinu Chakravarthy playing supporting roles. It was released on 23 February 1991.

Plot 

Hari and his parents as well as Bharathi and her parents settle for the holidays in the same hotel in Ooty. Hari and Bharathi get into several quarrels until they fall in love with each other. Their parents have come to know their love affair and refuse to unite them. Later, the lovers elope and they try to commit suicide. Johnson David, a retired military officer, saves them in time and he accommodates the young lovers. What transpires later forms the crux of the story.

Cast 

Jayanthkumar as Hari
Vinodhini as Bharathi
R. Sarathkumar as Johnson David
Radha Ravi as Lollai Kaadu
Charle
S. S. Chandran as Mayil Vahanam, Bharathi's father
Vinu Chakravarthy as Hari's father
Kovai Sarala as Bharathi's mother
Vaani as Hari's mother
Dr. Nadesan
Master Kiruba
Joker Thulasi
Karmegham

Soundtrack 
The film score and the soundtrack were composed by M. S. Murali, with lyrics written by Vaali, Ilavenil, Kannadasan, Maruthi and Kanmani Subbu.

References

External links 
 

1991 films
Indian romance films
1990s Tamil-language films